"Nothin' but a Love Thang" is a song co-written and recorded by American country music artist Darryl Worley.  It was released in May 2006 as the first single from the album Here and Now.  The song peaked at No. 35 on the Billboard Hot Country Songs chart.  The song was written by Worley, Chris Stapleton and Steve Leslie.

Chart performance

References

2006 singles
2006 songs
Darryl Worley songs
Songs written by Chris Stapleton
Songs written by Darryl Worley
Song recordings produced by Frank Rogers (record producer)